Liverpool 78 is a live album by the Fall, first released on 4 June 2001.  These tracks have subsequently been reissued as part of an expanded Live at the Witch Trials.
The recording has historic interest but the sound quality is very poor.

Track listing
"Like to Blow" (Martin Bramah, Mark E. Smith) – 2:05
"Stepping Out" (Smith, Tony Friel) – 3:09
"Two Steps Back" (Bramah, Smith) – 5:51
"Mess of My" (Bramah, Smith, Goldstraw) – 3:24
"It's the New Thing" (Bramah) – 3:48
"Various Times" (Karl Burns, Smith, Bramah, Yvonne Pawlett, Marc Riley) – 4:59
"Bingo-Master's Break-Out!" (Una Baines, Smith) – 2:48
"Frightened" (Smith, Friel) – 5:35
"Industrial Estate" (Friel, Bramah, Smith) – 1:53
"Psycho Mafia" (Friel, Smith) – 3:01
"Music Scene" (Bramah, Pawlett, Smith, Riley) – 9:26
"Mother-Sister!" (Smith, Baines) – 3:31

Personnel
Mark E. Smith - vocals
Martin Bramah - guitar, backing vocals
Marc Riley - bass guitar
Yvonne Pawlett - keyboards
Karl Burns - drums

References 

The Fall (band) live albums
2001 live albums